The Clifton River is a tributary of the Eaton River, which flows into the Saint-François River which in turn flows on the south shore of the Saint-François River which in turn flows onto the south shore of the St. Lawrence River.

The Clifton River flows through the municipalities of Saint-Malo, Saint-Isidore-de-Clifton and Newport, in the Le Haut-Saint-François Regional County Municipality (MRC), in the administrative region of Estrie, in Quebec, in Canada.

Geography 

The neighboring hydrographic slopes of the Clifton River are:
 north side: Eaton River;
 east side: Eaton River;
 south side: Thompson stream;
 west side: Lajoie brook, Bobines brook, rivière aux Saumons (Massawippi River tributary).

The Clifton River originates in a small valley between two mountains (the northeastern one reaches ; the southern one reaches ), near Auckland Road, in the Fifth Rang of canton of Auckland, east of the village of Saint-Malo, in Estrie.

From its source in the municipality of Saint-Malo, this river descends on  towards the north, according to the following segments:
  northwesterly to the limit of the municipality of Saint-Isidore-de-Clifton;
  north-west, passing west of the village of Saint-Malo, to the limit of the township municipality of Saint-Isidore-de-Clifton;
  north-west, to the limit of the municipality of Newport;
  north, up to its mouth.

Toponymy 
The term "Clifton" is a family name of English origin.

The toponym "Clifton River" was formalized on December 5, 1968, at the Commission de toponymie du Québec.

See also 

 List of rivers of Quebec

References 

Le Haut-Saint-François Regional County Municipality
Rivers of Estrie